George "Rube" Foster (January 5, 1888 – March 1, 1976) was a Major League Baseball player.

Foster was picked up by the Boston Red Sox and made his major league debut for the team on April 10, . Foster acted as a starting pitcher and a relief pitcher for the team during the 19 games he pitched in during the season. Foster posted a 3–3 record with a 3.16 ERA and 36 strikeouts in 68.1 innings pitched.

Foster's sophomore season in the big leagues was one of his best, in which he pitched in 32 games, while starting in 27 of them. He finished with a 14–8 record, and finished second in the American League with an impressive 1.70 ERA. Foster was only behind his Boston Red Sox teammate, Dutch Leonard, who posted a 0.96 ERA, which is now considered the modern day all-time single-season record.

In , Foster posted a 20–8 record, and another impressive 2.11 ERA. Foster most effectively showed his importance to the team in the 1915 World Series where he picked up 2 complete game wins and only gave up 4 earned runs and struck out 13 batters in 18.0 innings. With the bat, Foster went 4-for-8, with a double and an RBI.

Foster had another good campaign in  acting as a starting pitcher and relief pitcher. He went 14–7 in the season, and posted a decent 3.06 ERA. On June 21 of that year, he no-hit the New York Yankees 2-0 at Fenway Park. In the 1916 World Series, Foster came in relief in Game 3, and pitched three scoreless innings. The Red Sox ended up winning the series 4 games to 1, and became the first back-to-back winners of the World Series since the Philadelphia Athletics had done it 5 years earlier.

Before the start of the  season, Foster was traded to the Cincinnati Reds for Dave Shean. Rube Foster refused to report to his new team and so the Red Sox sent cash to the Reds to complete the trade.

Rube Foster's baseball career ended, and he finished his major league career with 58–33 career pitching record, a 2.36 earned run average and 294 strikeouts in 842.1 innings pitched.

As a hitter, Foster posted a .215 batting average (58-for-270) with 1 home run, 19 RBI and 16 bases on balls. In three World Series appearances, he hit .444 (4-for-9) with 1 RBI. Defensively, he was better than average, recording a .970 fielding percentage which was 30 points higher than the league average at his position.

See also
 List of Major League Baseball no-hitters

References

External links

Baseball Almanac- Rube Foster
Baseball Library- Rube Foster

1888 births
1976 deaths
People from Coal County, Oklahoma
Major League Baseball pitchers
Baseball players from Oklahoma
Boston Red Sox players
Minor league baseball managers
Houston Buffaloes players
Vernon Tigers players
Oakland Oaks (baseball) players